This is a list of aircraft designated A1, A.1, A.I, A 1 or A-1:

Civilian aircraft 
 Albastar A1, Slovenian glider
 Andrews A1, an unsuccessful New Zealand agricultural aircraft
 Aviat A1 Husky, a 1987 American two seat, high wing, utility light aircraft
 CallAir A-1, a version of the 1940 American CallAir Model A utility aircraft

 Curtiss A-1, a 1911 American aircraft
 Eagle Model A-1, a three-place biplane open-cockpit aircraft made by American Eagle Aircraft Corporation
 Gotha A.I, a 1910 German Rumpler Taube model
 Pfalz A.I, a World War I German Idflieg A-class designation aircraft

Military aircraft 
 A-1 Skyraider, a United States Air Force/Navy single engine propeller driven attack aircraft
 Alcock Scout also known as Alcock A.1, a one-off 1917 British fighter biplane assembled from elements of other fighter aircraft
 Alter A.1, a 1917 German single-seat biplane fighter aircraft
 Ansaldo A.1 Balilla, a 1917 Italian fighter aircraft
 Arpin A-1, a 1938 unorthodox monoplane aircraft submitted to the British Army
 Fokker A.I, a 1910s German two-seat observation aircraft 
 Morane-Saulnier AI, a 1917 French parasol-wing fighter aircraft
 SPAD A-1, a French Société Pour L'Aviation et ses Dérivés airplane, prototype for the 1915 SPAD A.2 fighter-reconnaissance aircraft
 A-1, a designation in the Brazilian Air Force for the AMX International AMX fighter aircraft

Gliders 
 Antonov A-1, a 1930s Soviet Union family of single-seat training gliders
 Levasseur-Abrial A-1, a 1922 French glider

A1